Jolly Rancher is an American brand of sweet hard candy, gummies, jelly beans, lollipops, sour bites, and a line of soda put out by Elizabeth Beverage Company in 2004. It is currently manufactured by The Hershey Company.

History 
Bill and Dorothy Harmsen founded the Jolly Rancher Company in 1949, choosing the name to give the impression of a friendly Western company, and opened their first Jolly Rancher Ice Cream Store in Golden, Colorado on May 28, 1949. Finding that ice cream was hard to sell in the cold winter months, they added a line of bulk and boxed chocolate that was provided by a small candy firm in the Denver area. Jolly Rancher Company opened a number of franchise stores in Colorado, Wyoming and Nebraska and provided both chocolate candies and a five cent hot cinnamon taffy stick that proved to be very popular. It was this candy's popularity that caused Jolly Rancher Company to expand its hard candy line.

Jolly Rancher filed for a trademark for Jolly Rancher as a word mark on March 31, 1958, and received registration number 0695762 for that trademark on April 5, 1960. The first use in commerce for that Jolly Rancher word mark was noted in the filing as being June 1,1960.

In 1966, Jolly Rancher Company was sold to Beatrice Foods, although Bill Harmsen continued to operate the business. In 1983, Leaf, Inc. acquired a number of candy brands from Beatrice, Jolly Rancher included. In October 1996, The Hershey Company agreed to purchase the North American confectionery brands of Leaf, Inc. which included Jolly Rancher, Whoppers, Milk Duds, Good & Plenty, PayDay and Heath bar.  As part of the transaction, Hershey agreed to sell most of its European candy operations to Huhtamäki Oy, Leaf's parent company.

In 2002, Hershey closed the Arvada, Colorado plant and moved the manufacturing of the candy to Mexico to save costs.

In 2014, Hershey acquired Ontario based company The Allan Candy Co. and moved the manufacturing of the candy exclusively to the Granby plant, in Quebec, Canada.

Flavors 
Jolly Rancher's original flavors were watermelon, apple, and fire stix. They soon introduced cherry, orange tangerine, lemon, grape, peach, black licorice, and sour apple. Eventually, blue raspberry replaced lemon. Current flavors include cherry, blue raspberry, grape, green apple, and watermelon. There are also sour, cinnamon, and smoothie varieties. In 2013, lemon was reintroduced in an all-lemon bag. In 2015, Jolly Rancher offered a "Fruity Bash" variety bag which includes strawberry, mountain berry, lemon, orange, and pineapple. In 2017, Jolly Rancher offered a "Hotties" variety bag which includes watermelon & cayenne pepper, blue raspberry & sriracha, cherry & habanero, and green apple & ginger. In 2020, Jolly Rancher offered a tropical variety bag featuring fruit punch, golden pineapple, lime, and mango flavors. They also offer a "red" bag, which included cherry, watermelon, strawberry and fruit punch. As of 2012, the passion mix, which included the peach flavor, and the wild berry mix were discontinued by The Hershey Company. The Hotties mix has been discontinued as of 2019. In 2020, the peach flavor has been brought back in an "all-peach" bag, and replaced the mountain berry flavor in the Fruity Bash bag.

Product variations

Chemistry 
Jolly Ranchers are amorphous solids, meaning their molecular arrangements have no specific pattern. They are hard, brittle, rigid, translucent and have low molecular mobility. Jolly Ranchers are formed from highly concentrated sugar solutions (greater than 95% sugar) and have extremely high viscosity. Their "glassy" appearance is a result of the way they are processed. During processing, the sugar syrup is cooled so rapidly that no crystals have time to form. Jolly Ranchers hold their solid shape when kept in temperatures less than the glass transition temperature (Tg). If the temperature is greater than the Tg, the hard and glassy-like structure of the Jolly Rancher becomes a soft and rubbery material.

Manufacturing 
As the mixture is cooled, natural and artificial flavoring and artificial colors are added to individual batches of syrup solution which are later mixed with malic acid to improve shelf life and add further flavor. Once the mixture begins to cool, it is then extruded into long malleable strings that are cut to size and individually wrapped and packaged.

References

External links
 

Golden, Colorado
The Hershey Company brands
Products introduced in 1949
American confectionery
Brand name confectionery